In mathematics and computer science, a rational series is a generalisation of the concept of formal power series over a ring to the case when the basic algebraic structure is no longer a ring but a semiring, and the indeterminates adjoined are not assumed to commute.  They can be regarded as algebraic expressions of a formal language over a finite alphabet.

Definition
Let R be a semiring and A a finite alphabet.

A non-commutative polynomial over A is a finite formal sum of words over A.  They form a semiring .

A formal series is a R-valued function c, on the free monoid A*, which may be written as

The set of formal series is denoted  and becomes a semiring under the operations

A non-commutative polynomial thus corresponds to a function c on A* of finite support.

In the case when R is a ring, then this is the Magnus ring over R.

If L is a language over A, regarded as a subset of A* we can form the characteristic series of L as the formal series

corresponding to the characteristic function of L.

In  one can define an operation of iteration expressed as

and formalised as

The rational operations are the addition and multiplication of formal series, together with iteration.
A rational series is a formal series obtained by rational operations from

See also
 Formal power series
 Rational language 
 Rational set
 Hahn series (Malcev–Neumann series)
 Weighted automaton

References

Further reading 
 
 Droste, M., & Kuich, W. (2009). Semirings and Formal Power Series. Handbook of Weighted Automata, 3–28. 
 Sakarovitch, J. Rational and Recognisable Power Series. Handbook of Weighted Automata, 105–174 (2009). 
 W. Kuich. Semirings and formal power series: Their relevance to formal languages and automata theory. In G. Rozenberg and A. Salomaa, editors, Handbook of Formal Languages, volume 1, Chapter 9, pages 609–677. Springer, Berlin, 1997

Abstract algebra
Formal languages
Mathematical series